The DEFA cannon (Direction des Études et Fabrications d'Armement) is a family of widely-used French-made aircraft revolver cannon firing 30 mm caliber NATO standard rounds.

Design history
The initial DEFA 551 was developed in the late 1940s. It is based on the German Mauser MG 213C, an experimental revolver cannon developed for the Luftwaffe. The MG 213 never reached production, but inspired the DEFA, the very similar British ADEN cannon, and the smaller American M39 cannon. As the DEFA 552 it entered production in 1954. In 1968 an upgraded version, Canon 550-F3, was developed, entering production in 1971 as the DEFA 553. The new version provided a new feed system, nitro-chrome plated steel barrel, forged drum casing, and improved electrical reliability.

Overview

The DEFA 553 is a gas-operated five-chamber revolver cannon using pyrotechnic cocking and electrical ignition. It fires a range of 30 mm ammunition of various types, and is capable of continuous fire or 0.5-second or 1-second bursts.

The 553 was superseded by the DEFA 554, which incorporates a number of detail improvements. The DEFA 554 uses three, rather than two, of the chambers for reloading, increasing the rate of fire. Barrel life and mechanical reliability are improved, and an electrical control unit allows the pilot to select two rates of fire: 1,800 rounds per minute for air-to-air use or 1,200 rounds per minute for air-to-ground attacks. The 554 also provides three Pyrotechnic cocking charges rather than one, allowing the pilot to cock the weapon after take-off and have two cartridges to re-cock the weapon if necessary in flight.

Service use

The DEFA 550 series was the standard cannon armament of all gun-armed French fighters from 1954 until the advent of the Dassault Rafale in the 1980s. A pair of these weapons, with 125–135 rounds per gun, is standard fit on the Brazilian ground-attack aircraft AMX International AMX, the French Dassault MD 450 Ouragan, Dassault Mystere, Mirage III/V, Dassault Étendard IV and Dassault Super Étendard, Sud Aviation Vautour, Mirage F1, SEPECAT Jaguar, and the Mirage 2000 series. It was also used on Israeli Douglas A-4E/F/H/N Skyhawks, IAI Nesher, IAI Kfir, and IAI Lavi, the Italian Fiat G.91Y and Aermacchi MB-326K, the Indonesian A-4, and the South African Atlas Cheetah and Impala Mk.II. Various gun pod installations are available from CASA, Dassault Aviation, and Matra.

The DEFA 550 is very similar to the British ADEN cannon, and can use the same ammunition.

The DEFA 550 series has given way to the GIAT 30 series used on the Dassault Rafale, although it is likely to remain in widespread use for many years.

Variants
 DEFA 551 for the Dassault Mystère IV, the Dassault Mystère IIC, and the Sud Aviation Vautour
 DEFA 552 for the Dassault Super Mystère B2, the Dassault Étendard IV, and the Aeritalia G.91Y
 DEFA 552A for the Mirage III/5/50, the Nesher/Dagger/Finger, the IAI Kfir, and the IAI Lavi
 DEFA 553 for the Dassault Mirage F1, the Alpha Jet, the SEPECAT Jaguar, the Dassault-Breguet Super Étendard, the Mirage 2000D RMV, the Aermacchi MB-326K, the CASA C-101, the Atlas Cheetah, the Impala Mk II, the IA-58B/C, and the IA-63
 DEFA 554 for the single-seat Mirage 2000, the AMX A-1, the IA-58D, and the IA-63

Operators

Current operators 
 : Mirage 2000, previously Super Étendard, Mirage F1, Jaguar, Mirage 5, Étendard IVM, Mirage III, Super Mystère B2, Mystère IV, Mystère IIC, and Vautour II
 : Mirage 2000-9, previously Mirage 5, Mirage III, and MB-326K
 : Mirage 2000I/TI, previously Mystère IV
 : Mirage 2000-5 Mk2, previously Mirage F1
 : Kfir Block 60, previously Mirage 5
 : AMX, previously Mirage 2000C/B and Mirage III
 : Mirage 2000-5, previously Mirage F1
 : Mirage 2000-5
 : Mirage F1 ASTRAC
 : Mirage 5 ROSE and Mirage III
 : Cheetah, previously Mirage F1, Kfir, Mirage 50 and Impala Mk II
 : Super Étendard Modernisé, A-4 and IA-63, previously IA-58, Finger, Dagger, Mirage 5P, and Mirage III
 : Mirage 2000P/DP, previously Mirage 5P
 : Mirage 2000EM/BM and Mirage 5
 : Mirage F1
 : Kfir
 : A-36 Toqui/C-101CC, previously Mirage 50, Mirage 5 and Mirage III
 : Mirage F1, previously Mirage 5
 : Mirage F1, previously Mirage 5

Former operators 
 : Mirage F1 and Mirage III
 : Cheetah, Mirage F1, Nesher, Mirage III and Impala Mk II
 : A-4, Lavi, Kfir, Nesher, Mirage 5, Mirage IIIC, Super Mystère B2, Mystère IV, and Vautour II
 : C-101CC and Mirage F1
 : Super Étendard and Mirage F1
 : Mirage F1
 : Mirage 50, Mirage 5 and Mirage III
 : Mirage 5
 : Mirage 5
 : Mirage 5 and MB-326K
 : Mirage III
 : Mirage III
 : Mirage III
 : Super Mystère B2
 : G.91Y
 : A-4
 : MB-326K
 : MB-326K

See also
 Mauser BK-27 – comparable German design
 GIAT 30

References

External links

 Nexter website: DEFA 30M factsheet
 South Africa Air Force: DEFA cannon factsheet
 List of Military Gatling & Revolver cannons

Video links
  of an Argentinian IAI Dagger during the Battle of San Carlos

30 mm artillery
Aircraft guns
Autocannon
Nexter Systems
Military equipment introduced in the 1950s